Colombe is a play in four acts by French dramatist Jean Anouilh, written in 1950, created at the Théâtre de l'Atelier on February 10, 1951, in a mise-en-scène, set and costumes by André Barsacq and published in 1951 at Éditions de la Table ronde in Pièces brillantes.

Plot summary
A large self-centred actress lacking maternal fibre must face the return of her son Julien, who is intransigent and jealous of his brother Armand who his mother always babied. He refused any special favours in order to escape his three years of military service that awaited him, so he leaves his young, naïve and submissive wife Colombe. The mother decides to hire Colombe at the theatre. The woman would jump with joy, happy at becoming her own woman, and would break up with Julien.

Théâtre de l'Atelier, 1951

 Mise-en-scène: André Barsacq
 Set: André Barsacq
 Costumes: André Barsacq
 Characters and actors:
 Colombe: Danièle Delorme
 Julien: Yves Robert
 Madame Georges: Gabrielle Fontan
 Madame Alexandra: Marie Ventura
 Le pédicure: Jacques Rispal
 La Surette (the sour one): Jacques Dufilho
 Armand: José Quaglio
Desfournettes: Marcel Pérès
 Poète-Chéri: Maurice Jacquemont
 Le coiffeur (the hairdresser): Henri Djanik
 Du Bartas: Paul Oettly
 First Machinist: Georges Norel
 Second Machinist: Charles Nugue

Théâtre de l'Atelier, 1954
 Mise en scène: André Barsacq
 Set: André Barsacq
 Costumes: André Barsacq
 Characters and actors:
 Colombe: Danièle Delorme
 Julien: Yves Robert
 Madame Georges: Madeleine Geoffroy
 Madame Alexandra: Marie Ventura
 Le pédicure: Roger Marino
 La Surette: Jacques Dufilho
 Armand: José Quaglio
 Desfournettes: Jean Brunel
 Poète-Chéri: Maurice Nasil
 Le coiffeur: Jacques Ciron
 Du Bartas: Paul Oettly

Comédie des Champs-Élysées, 1974
 Mise en scène: Jean Anouilh and Roland Piétri
 Set: Jean-Denis Malclès
 Costumes: Jean-Denis Malclès
 Characters and actors:
 Colombe: Danièle Lebrun
 Julien: Daniel Colas
 Madame Georges: Annette Poivre
 Madame Alexandra: Luce Garcia-Ville
 Le pédicure: Roger Lauran
 La Surette: Angelo Bardi
 Armand: Michel Boy
 Desfournettes: Roland Piétri
 Poète-Chéri: Robert Murzeau
 Le coiffeur: Jean-Pierre Dravel
 Du Bartas: Pierre Bertin

Comédie des Champs-Élysées, 1996
After January 19, 1996, at the Comédie des Champs-Élysées.
 Mise en scène: Michel Fagadau
 Set: Ghislain Ury
 Costumes: Ghislain Ury
 Lighting: Laurent Béal
 Characters and actors:
 Colombe: Laure Marsac
 Julien: Yannick Soulier
 Geneviève Page
 Jean-Paul Roussillon
 Gabriel Cattand
 Isabelle Moulin
 Josiane Lévêque
 José Paul

Comédie des Champs-Élysées, 2010
 Mise en scène: Michel Fagadau
 Set: Mathieu Dupuy
 Costumes: Pascale Bordet
 Characters and actors:
 Colombe: Sara Giraudeau
 Julien: Gregori Baquet
 Madame Alexandra: Anny Duperey
 La Surette: Rufus
 Du Bartas: Jean-Pierre Moulin
 Madame Georges: Fabienne Chaudat
 Emile Robinet or Poète-Chéri: Jean-Paul Bordes
 Le coiffeur: Jean-François Pargoud
 Armand: Benjamin Bellecour
 Desfournettes: Etienne Draber
 Machinists: Bastien Cousseau, Frederic Duval, Yvon-Olivier Garcia

At the 2010 Molière Award, Anny Duperey was nominated for Best Actress, Fabienne Chaudat for Best Supporting Actor and Pascale Bordet for Best Costumes.

The presentation of May 15, 2010 was broadcast live on France 2.

Plays by Jean Anouilh
1951 plays